G